The 1925 Detroit City College Tartars football team was an American football team that represented Detroit City College (later renamed Wayne State University) as an independent during the 1925 college football season. The team compiled a 4–3–1 record and outscored opponents by a total of 118 to 58. Leigh Pascoe was the team captain.

Schedule

References

Detroit City College
Wayne State Warriors football seasons
Detroit City College Tartars football